The discography of Rhonda Vincent, an American bluegrass artist, consists of eighteen studio albums and fifteen singles.

Studio albums

1990s

2000s

2010s

2020s

Collaboration albums

Live albums

Compilation albums

Holiday albums

Singles

Other appearances

Music videos

References

Country music discographies
Discographies of American artists